Rasool Pur is a village in the district of Gujrat, Pakistan. It has a population of 2000 - 3000 people.

References

Villages in Gujrat District